is a Japanese science fiction manga created by Shotaro Ishinomori. It was serialized in many different Japanese magazines, including Monthly Shōnen King, Weekly Shōnen Magazine, Shōnen Big Comic, COM, Shōjo Comic, Weekly Shōnen Sunday, Monthly Shōnen Jump, and Monthly Comic Nora. In 2012, comiXology acquired the digital distribution rights to Shotaro Ishinomori's catalogue, including Cyborg 009.

Plot

Nine people from around the world are kidnapped by the evil Black Ghost organization, led by the tyrant Skull, to undergo experiments that would allow him to use them as human weapons to promote the production of cyborg warfare. While he succeeds in converting the group of nine into cyborgs with superhuman powers, his most reputable scientist, Dr. Isaac Gilmore, helps the cyborgs escape to rebel against Skull and Black Ghost. The nine cyborgs – from which the name of the series is derived – band together in order to stop Black Ghost from achieving its goal of starting the next world war by supplying rich buyers with countless weapons of mass destruction. After the destruction of Black Ghost, the nine cyborgs go on to fight a variety of threats, such as mad scientists, supernatural beings, and ancient civilizations.

Media

Manga

The first arc was serialized in Weekly Shōnen King (Shōnen Gahosha). It depicts Cyborg 009's origin story, the escape from Black Ghost, and the group running from the cyborg assassins. It ended with the battle against the Mythos Cyborgs.

The second arc, called The Underground Empire Yomi Arc, appeared in Weekly Shōnen Magazine (Kodansha) alongside the release of the film version. The story is highly influenced by Edgar Rice Burroughs' Earth's Core series, including an expedition to the center of the Earth with a drill tank and a reptile race who can use telepathy and grow wings. The story ends with the final battle against Black Ghost. In the final scene, 009 and 002 fall into Earth's atmosphere and are seen as a shooting star by two small children, one of whom wishes for a toy gun and the other for world peace (a scene reminiscent of Ray Bradbury's Kaleidoscope). As such, 001 was able to use his telekinetic powers at the last minute to retrieve 002 and 009 from their plummet before death.

The third arc, serialized in Bōken Ō (Akita Shoten), contained 6 story arcs, including the Monster Island Arc, the Middle East Arc, and the Angels Arc. The series abruptly ended during the Angels Arc.

The fourth arc, called The Battle of the Gods Arc, was serialized in COM (Mushi Production). Ishinomori resumed and retold the interrupted Angels Arc with a new plot, but the series once again ended abruptly. Ishinomori would not resume the series for a few years after this.

The fifth arc was serialized in Shōjo Comic (Shogakukan), and included the Wind City Arc, the Snow Carnival Arc, and the Edda Arc. The story deals with legendary and mythical like characters challenging the 00 Number Cyborgs.

The sixth arc followed closely after the fifth arc. Arcs such as the Deinonychus Arc (appeared in Monthly Shōnen Jump (Shueisha)) and Green Hole Arc (appeared in Play Comic (Akita Shoten)) were depicted, then long after, the Underwater Pyramid Arc was serialized in Monthly Manga Shōnen (Asahi Sonorama).

The seventh arc was serialized in Weekly Shōnen Sunday (Shogakukan) alongside the revival anime. A long arc consisting of many short arcs, this series dealt with the battle against Neo Black Ghost as well as the emotional trauma of the 00 Number Cyborgs. The story is set approximately 20 years after the Yomi Arc, and the personalities and conduct of the cyborgs are depicted as more adult.

The eighth arc was serialized in Monthly Comic Nora (Gakken). This longer arc was called People Drifting Through Time and Space Arc, and is a sequel to the Immigration Arc. The Count of St. Germain from the Underwater Pyramid Arc appears, but the design of his drawing is different.

Manga publication history
The series was written and illustrated by Shotaro Ishinomori, serialized in Monthly Shōnen King, published in Japan by Akita Shoten and other companies through its history, and published in North America by Tokyopop.

Digital comics distributor comiXology licensed the entire catalogue from Ishimori Productions in 2012, and has made the first 10 volumes of Cyborg 009 available to the public.

In April 2012, Shogakukan announced that the Cyborg 009 manga would conclude in Weekly Shōnen Sunday. Entitled Cyborg 009 Conclusion: God's War, the manga is to be illustrated by Masato Hayase and to be based on Ishinomori's original concept notes, sketches, and novel drafts, all of which had been gathered by his son, Jo Onodera. Conclusion debuted on April 13, 2012, and ran until February 2014. It was collected in 5 volumes.

Cyborg 009 Bgooparts Delete
A manga series written and illustrated by Tsuguo Okazaki, titled Cyborg 009 Bgooparts Delete, began serialization in Champion Red on July 19, 2019.

8 Man vs. Cyborg 009 
A crossover manga between 8 Man and Cyborg 009 by Kyoichi Nanatsuk (script) and Masato Hayate (art), began serializing in Champion Red on July 18, 2020.

Graphic novel
A full-color graphic novel based on the franchise was released at San Diego Comic-Con International on July 21, 2013, to align with the anniversary of Ishinomori's original manga. The book is a condensed retelling of the 00 Cyborgs' battle against Black Ghost, led by Sekar (Skull). The full release was on September 11, 2013. The graphic novel is written by F. J. DeSanto and Bradley Cramp, penciled and inked by Marcus To, and published by Archaia Comics.

Films

1966 film
The first Cyborg 009 film was released on July 21, 1966. It was produced by Hiroshi Ōkawa (uncredited) and directed by Yugo Serikawa.

 was the second film for Cyborg 009 and released on March 19, 1967. It was produced by  Hiroshi Ōkawa and directed by Yugo Serikawa.

Cast

009: Hiroyuki Ōta
001: Kyoko Toriyama
002: Ryō Ishihara
003: Judy Ongg
004: Hiroshi Ōtake
005: Hiroshi Masuoka
006: Arihiro Fujimura
007: Machiko Soga
008: Kenji Utsumi
Professor Gilmore: Jōji Yanami
Black Ghost Leader: Masato Yamanouchi
Beagle: Kiyoshi Kawakubo
Easel: Sanji Hase
Helena: Etsuko Ichihara
Narrator: Ryō Kurosawa

1980 anime film
An anime film based on the second anime television series was released on December 20, 1980, named .

Cast

009: Kazuhiko Inoue/Walter Carroll
001: Fuyumi Shiraishi/Mary Malone
002: Keiichi Noda/Don Pomes
003: Kazuko Sugiyama/Michelle Hart
004: Keaton Yamada/Richard Nieskins
005: Banjo Ginga/Frank Rogers
006: Sanji Hase/Jeff Manning
007: Kaneta Kimotsuki/James Keating
008: Kazuyuki Sogabe/Clay Lowrey
Professor Gilmore: Jōji Yanami/Cliff Harrington
Dr Cosmo: Ichirō Nagai/Mike Worman
Saba: Noriko Ohara/Gerri Sorrells
Princess Tamara: Hiroko Suzuki/Deborah DeSnoo
Zoa: Tōru Ōhira/William Ross
Gallo: Chikao Ohtsuka/Lanny Broyles
Narrator: Ryō Ishihara/Avi Laudau

2012 film (009 Re:Cyborg)
A 3D film, produced by Production I.G., Sanzigen and Ishimori Productions, was released on October 27, 2012. Kenji Kamiyama was the director and writer. Kenji Kawai, who worked before with Kamiyama on Moribito: Guardian of the Spirit and Eden of the East, composed the music. The film was released in Japan on October 27, 2012. It also opened simultaneously in more than five Asian regions, including Hong Kong, Taiwan, Singapore, Malaysia, and South Korea. A manga adaptation by Gatou Asou, character designer for Moribito and Occult Academy, was serialized in Square Enix's Monthly Big Gangan. The UK anime distributor Anime Limited announced that they acquired the movie and produced an English dub at NYAV Post. Madman Entertainment also has rights to release the film in Australia and New Zealand. At Anime Expo 2013, Funimation had announced that they acquired the film for North America. The English voice cast was announced on April 16, 2015.

2016 film trilogy (Cyborg 009: Call of Justice)
Another 3D film, produced by Production I.G. and animated by OLM Digital and Signal.MD and distributed by Toho, was released on November 25, 2016. The movie itself was divided into three parts, with Part 2 being released December 2, 2016 and Part 3 on December 9, 2016. Kenji Kamiyama was chief director of the project, and Kokai Kakimoto directed the film. Netflix acquired digital distribution rights to the movie, where the movie was shown first on Netflix Japan in Spring 2016, with other territories following later. The films, edited down into 12 episodes, were released worldwide on Netflix on February 10, 2017.

Cast

009: Keisuke Koumoto/Kyle McCarley
001: Misato Fukuen/Erica Mendez
002: Takuya Satō/Robbie Daymond
003: Risa Taneda/Cristina Vee
004: Satoshi Hino/Ray Chase
005: Kenji Nomura/Chris Tergliafera
006: Mitsuaki Madono/Kirk Thornton
007: Setsuji Satō/Ben Diskin
008: Haruki Ishiya/Zeno Robinson
Katarina Canetti: Yui Makino/Cherami Leigh
Emperor: Kazuhiko Inoue/Patrick Seitz

Television series

1968 series
An anime adaptation was released on April 5, 1968, on NET and ended on September 27, 1968, with a total of 26 episodes. This series was directed by Yugo Serikawa, Takeshi Tamiya, Tomoharu Katsumata, Toshio Katsuda, Taiji Yabushita, Ryōzō Tanaka, Yoshikata Nitta, Kazuya Miyazaki, Fusahiro Nagaki, Minoru Okazaki, Yoshio Takami.

Cast

009: Katsuji Mori (as Setsuya Tanaka)
001: Fuyumi Shiraishi
002: Ryō Ishihara
003: Hiroko Suzuki
004: Hiroshi Ōtake/Kenji Utsumi
005: Hiroshi Masuoka
006: Ichirō Nagai
007: Machiko Soga
008: Keiichi Noda
Professor Gilmore: Jōji Yanami

DVD Box
The "サイボーグ009 モノクロ DVD BOX" was released in January 2006 from Buena Vista Home Entertainment. The low-priced edition "サイボーグ009 1968 DVD-COLLECTION" was released in July 2009 from TOEI COMPANY, LTD.

1979–1980 series
Another anime for Cyborg 009 was released on March 6, 1979, on TV Asahi and ended on March 25, 1980, with a total of 50 episodes.

The lyrics were by Saburō Yatsude while the composer was Masaaki Harao, the arrangement was done by Koichi Sugiyama and vocals were provided by Koorogi '73. The show was a huge hit in Sweden where it was one of the earliest anime series to be dubbed into Swedish and released in its entirety on VHS. The success with the audience came despite the fact that the entire voice cast was provided by one actor, Danish national Timm Mehrens.

Cast

009: Kazuhiko Inoue
001: Sachiko Chijimatsu
002: Keiichi Noda
003: Kazuko Sugiyama
004: Keaton Yamada
005: Banjō Ginga (as Takashi Tanaka)
006: Sanji Hase
007: Kaneta Kimotsuki
008: Kōji Totani
Professor Gilmore: Kōsei Tomita
Brahma: Toshio Furukawa
Vishnu: Takashi Tanaka
Shiva: Kōji Totani
Gandal: Kōji Nakata
Odin: Ichirō Nagai/Shigezō Sasaoka (Neo Black Ghost Arc)
Loki: Isamu Tanonaka
Thor: Hidekatsu Shibata
Freya: Rihoko Yoshida
Narrator: Keiichi Noda

2001–2002 series

A third television series, entitled Cyborg 009: The Cyborg Soldier was broadcast on TV Tokyo from October 14, 2001 to October 13, 2002 on Sundays at 18:30. It spanned a total of fifty-one episodes.

The opening theme song for the third anime television series was "What's the Justice?" by Globe. The first ending theme was "Genesis of Next" by Globe followed by "Starting from Here" by Globe and later was replaced with "I Do" by Fayray.

The 2001–2002 series of Cyborg 009: The Cyborg Soldier was dubbed by Animaze, Inc. and ZRO Limit Productions, and was shortened to its manga name. The English-dubbed version of Cyborg 009 aired on Cartoon Network as part of its weekday after-school action anime/animation programming block, Toonami in 2003 with the first 26 episodes, and was on its unnamed late Friday night/Early Saturday morning “Graveyard Shift” line-up in 2004 to air episodes 27 to 42, before it was dropped from their lineup. The edited version of the series was also distributed by Sony Pictures Family Entertainment Group, while the uncut version is distributed by Sony Pictures Television.

Cast

009: Takahiro Sakurai/Joshua Seth, David Umansky (episodes 5 and 9)
009 as a child: Takako Honda/Joshua Seth
001: Kana Ueda/Bob Marx
002: Showtaro Morikubo/Sparky Allen
003: Satsuki Yukino/Midge Mayes
004: Nobuo Tobita/Peter Doyle
005: Akio Ōtsuka/John Daniels (role mistakenly credited for David Umansky)
006: Chafurin/Steve Kramer
007: Yūichi Nagashima/Michael Sorich
008: Mitsuo Iwata/Keith Anthony
Professor Gilmore: Mugihito/Simon Prescott
Skull: Norio Wakamoto/Richard Epcar
Professor Kozumi: Junpei Takiguchi/Ray Michaels
0010: Issei Futamata/Joe Ochman
Hilda: Akiko Koike/Lia Sargent
0011: Tōru Ōkawa/James Lyon
0012: Sayuri/Melora Harte
Mr. Yasu: Kōsuke Okano/Dan Woren
0013: Kentarō Itō/David Lucas
Scare: Tetsuo Gotō/Dave Lelyveld
Machinegun: Mitsuaki Hoshino/David Umansky
Roentgen: Kōichi Nagano/Gil Starberry
Dr. Beruku: Aruno Tahara/Dave Lelyveld
Zanbaruzu: Fumihiko Tachiki/Jake Martin
Recruit: Naoki Yanagi/Bob Marx
Cynthia Findoru: Tomoko Kawakami/Julie Maddalena
Prof. Findoru: Kazuaki Ito/Jeremy Platt
Jean-Paul Arnoul: Nobutoshi Canna/Richard Hayworth
Natalie: Sachiko Kojima/Deanna Morris
Sophie/Rosa: Yōko Sōmi/Lia Sargent (Sophie), Jane Alan (Rosa)
Unbaba: Shōzō Iizuka
Kabore: Wataru Takagi/David Rasner
Mamado: Ryōtarō Okiayu/David Rasner
Freje: Minoru Inaba/David Lucas
Yang: Mitsuru Ogata/Jeff Nimoy
Gustav: Tetsuo Kanao/Jeremy Platt
Mrs. Tsuyama: Tomie Kataoka/Sonja S. Fox
Cathy: Kaori Saiki/Melora Harte
Jimmy: Yoshiko Kamei/Barbara Goodson
Dr. Ross: Masaru Ikeda/Jeremy Platt
Dr. Kiley: Yasunori Masutani/Terry Roberts
Apollo: Akira Ishida/Richard Hayworth
Artemis: Minami Takayama/Lia Sargent
Minotaur: Tomoya Kawai/John Smallberries
Achilles: Hiroshi Yanaka/David Umansky
Hera/Pan: Yū Sugimoto/Sonja S. Fox (Hera)
Atlas: Kiyoyuki Yanada
Nereus: Tomoya Kawai
Poseidon: Kiyoyuki Yanada/Ray Michaels
Professor Gaia: Ikuya Sawaki/David Umansky
Pal: Yūki Tokiwa/David Umansky
Blue Beast: Masane Tsukayama/Abe Lasser
Carl Eckermann: Shinichiro Miki/Steve Areno
Dr. Eckermann: Takkō Ishimori/Abe Lasser
Hachiro Marukaku: Nobuyuki Kobushi/Richard Hayworth
Dr. Shishigashira: Daisuke Egawa
Dr. Mamushi: Sukekiyo Kameyama/Tom Charles
Dr. Kong: Tomoya Kawai/John Smallberries
Dr. Dracula: Tomohisa Aso/Peter Spellos
Dr. Alligator: Sosuke Komori/Jake Martin
Dr. Herschel: Masaaki Tsukada/Anthony Mozdy
Princess Ixquic: Sumi Shimamoto/Wendee Lee
Alice: Natsuki Yamashita/Reba West
Lina: Mie Sonozaki/Cindy Robinson
Cain: Toshiyuki Morikawa/David Umansky
Mai: Romi Park/Sonja S. Fox
Phil: Mitsuki Saiga/Richard Hayworth
Nichol: Tomoya Kawai/Jeff Nimoy
Dr. Gamo Whisky/Asimov: Seizō Katō/Anthony Mozdy
Erica Whisky: Hikari Yono
Professor Isono: Naomi Kusumi/Abe Lasser
Shinichi Ibaraki: Isshin Chiba/David Umansky
Shinichi as a child: Akiko Koike/David Umansky
Masaru Oyamada: Nobuyuki Kobushi/Tony Oliver
Masaru as a child: Ayako Ito/Tony Oliver
Mary Onodera: Takako Honda/Wendee Lee
Van Vogt: Unshō Ishizuka/David Lucas
Helen/Vena/Daphne/Aphro/Dinah: Yuki Masuda (all) /Michelle Ruff (Helen), Lia Sargent (Vena), Jane Alan (Daphne), Kay Jensen (Aphro), Julie Ann Taylor (Dinah)
Black Ghost (male): Kenji Utsumi/James Lyon
Black Ghost (female): Ryoko Kinomiya/Jane Alan
Black Ghost (child): Yūshō Uemura/Barbara Goodson
Kazu: Yuki Tokiwa/Jane Alan
Kazu's sister: Risa Shimizu/Wendee Lee

Original video animation
A three-part original video animation crossover with Go Nagai's Devilman series, titled Cyborg 009 VS Devilman, received a two-week theatrical release in October 2015.  The OVA was directed by Jun Kawagoe. Netflix released the OVA internationally in 20 languages on April 1, 2016, including an English dub.

Cast

009: Jun Fukuyama/Johnny Yong Bosch
001: Haruka Shiraishi/Christine Marie Cabanos
002: Tomoaki Maeno/Spike Spencer
003: M.A.O/Stephanie Sheh
004: Hiroki Tōchi/Michael Sinterniklaas
005: Tsuyoshi Koyama/Keith Silverstein
006: Yū Mizushima/Joey Lotsko
007: Hozumi Gōda/Tony Azzolino
008: Ayumu Okamura/Steve Staley
Apollo: Akira Ishida/Fred McDougal
Helena: Yōko Honna/Christine Marie Cabanos
Dr. Isaac Gilmore: Shigeru Ushiyama/Dave Mallow

Radio dramas

1979 radio drama
A radio drama was produced for NBS's Kirin Radio Theater from January 29 to February 23, 1979.

Cast

009: Akira Kamiya
001: Sachiko Chijimatsu
002: Kazuyuki Sogabe
003: Kazuko Sugiyama
004: Shunsuke Shima
005: Ryüsuke Shiomi
006: Masayuki Yuhara
007: Kaneta Kimotsuki
008: Toyokazu Minami
Dr. Gilmore: Hitoshi Takagi

2009 radio drama
A second radio drama, entitled Cyborg 009: Birth, was aired in two parts on September 21 and 28, 2009.

Cast

009: Takeshi Kusao
001: Katsue Miwa
002: Hideyuki Hori
003: Machiko Toyoshima
004: Nobutoshi Canna
005: Ryūzaburō Ōtomo
006: Kōzō Shioya
007: Keiichi Nanba
008: Toshio Furukawa
Dr. Gilmore: Takeshi Aono
Black Ghost Boss: Hidekatsu Shibata
Scientist A: Tomohisa Asō
Scientist B: Naoki Imamura
Underling: Ryōhei Nakao
Narration: Keiichi Noda
Part 1
Gamo Whiskey: Hirohiko Kakegawa
Erika: Kyoko Terase
Dancer: Isao Teramoto
Hilda: Akiko Sekina
Slave Trader: Keiichirō Yamamoto
Boy: Kohta Nemoto
Jailer: Masaru Suzuki
Part 2
Scientist C: Yasuhiko Tokuyama
Crewman A: Masaru Suzuki
Crewman B: Kohta Nemoto
Crewman C: Keiichirō Yamamoto
Robot: Isao Teramoto

Video games
Three video games based on the series were released only in Japan. One of them was an action platformer released for the Super Famicom by BEC in 1994; for each level the player selects one of the eight adult cyborgs (001 is not playable) as the leader of a strike force for a particular mission accompanied by two others. The second game (released by Telenet Japan's subsidiary Riot) in 1993 was for the Mega CD and is also a side scroller.

In 2002, Simple Characters 2000 Series Vol. 15: Cyborg 009: The Block Kuzushi was released for the PlayStation by Bandai.

International releases
The 1979 version aired in Italy in 1982 and became popular with Italian viewers.

All of the 50 episodes from the 1979 version were released in Sweden with a Swedish dub in a total of 25 VHS tapes between 1986 - 1989. All of the voices were done by the Danish actor Timm Mehrens.

The 2001 version aired on MBC 3 several times starting from 2005 and became extremely popular with Arab viewers. It also aired on Cartoon Network Australia's Toonami Block in 2002

North American releases
The 1967 movie was released in Mexico, and years later, the 2001 television series aired on Toonami in 2003. The movie was later replayed on Cadena Tres in 2007, and was quite popular with Mexican viewers.

The 1979 series was broadcast with English subtitles on Japanese-language television in Hawaii, California, and in the New York metropolitan area. The English subtitles were produced by San Francisco-based Fuji Television, which did not broadcast the series as part of its Japanese programming on KEMO-TV.

The 1980 film was released in the United States in 1988 by Celebrity Home Entertainment as Defenders of the Vortex, with an edited version of an English dub that was commissioned through the Tokyo, Japan-based Frontier Enterprises. It later received an unedited direct-to-video English release in 1995 by Best Film and Video Corporation with the full version of the same dub.

The 2001 TV series was licensed by Avex Inc. (the North American branch of Avex Mode, the 2001 series' original distributor in Japan) and dubbed into English by Animaze and ZRO Limit Productions. The entire series was dubbed, with the first 26 episodes shown on the Toonami programming block on Cartoon Network, while episodes 27 to 47 were shown on Cartoon Network's late Friday night "Graveyard Shift" block, right before the show was dropped from their line-up. The first 8 episodes were distributed on DVD by Columbia TriStar Home Entertainment in a two-disc uncut bilingual set, as well as two dub-only edited broadcast volumes of four episodes each along with Portuguese and Spanish dubs. As of 2017, none of the other episodes have become available on home video outside Japan and Hong Kong, but Madman Entertainment released the first 26 dubbed episodes to DVD in Australia; they are since out of print. Discotek Media announced during their Otakon 2017 panel that they have licensed the 2001 series, and they will release the entire series, in the uncut bilingual version, on a SDBD set. The purpose for this set is to restore the uncut version of the dub for the whole series to its best state possible, as well as the video quality. The uncut dub master tapes were damaged upon arrival, due to the age of the DA-88 tapes. The set has an 11-page essay about the restoration process by the company's producer and Anime News Network founder Justin Sevakis, along with an 83-page art gallery. The set was also the North American and dub premiere of the three-episode God's War finale. The set was officially released on June 25, 2019.

The 2012 movie is licensed by Funimation in North America, Anime Limited in the UK, and Madman Entertainment in Australia and New Zealand. An English dub was produced by NYAV Post, and a theatrical release was released in all three territories.

References

External links

 
SPTI's Anime & Animation Brochure: Cyborg 009
サイボーグ００９ Asahi Shimbun, 15 July 2008 
009 Re:Cyborg Movie

 
1964 manga
1966 anime films
1967 anime films
1968 anime television series debuts
1979 anime television series debuts
2001 anime television series debuts
Akita Shoten manga
Asahi Sonorama manga
Brain's Base
Cyborgs in anime and manga
Discotek Media
Fictional cyborgs
Kodansha manga
Manga adapted into films
Media Factory manga
OLM, Inc. animated films
Science fiction anime and manga
Shaft (company)
Shogakukan franchises
Shogakukan manga
Shotaro Ishinomori
Shōnen Gahōsha manga
Shueisha manga
Sunrise (company)
Signal.MD
Television series by Sony Pictures Television
Toei Animation films
Toei Animation television
Tokyopop titles
Toonami
TV Asahi original programming
TV Tokyo original programming